The Values Party was a New Zealand political party. It is considered the world's first national-level environmentalist party, pre-dating the use of "Green" as a political label. It was established in May 1972 at Victoria University of Wellington. Its first leader was Tony Brunt, and Geoff Neill, the party's candidate in the Dunedin North electorate, became the Deputy Leader.

Policies and beliefs
Several party manifestos sketched a progressive, semi-utopian blueprint for New Zealand's future as an egalitarian, ecologically sustainable society. The party appealed especially to those elements of the New Left who felt alienated by the small Marxist-Leninist parties of the day, and by the centre-left politics of the New Zealand Labour Party. From its beginning, the Values Party emphasised proposing alternative policies, rather than taking only an oppositionist stance to the ruling parties.

Values Party policies included campaigns against nuclear power and armaments, advocating zero-population and -economic growth, abortion, drug and homosexual law-reform. Although the Values Party never sat in parliament, it drew considerable attention to these topics. Many political scientists credit the Values Party with making the environment a political issue, and with prompting other parties - even the German Greens - to formulate their own environmental policies.

Origins and organisation 
The initial idea for a new New Zealand political party came in 1972 when Tony Brunt, then a political student at Victoria University, was reflecting on his own research into the Club of Rome's The Limits to Growth and Charles Reich's The Greening of America (among other publications). Brunt saw the potential for a new constituency driven by a new set of social and environmental values. Brunt met with his ex New Zealand Herald colleague Norman Smith who immediately became the party's "1st hand man" and organiser.  "The media experience of Brunt and Smith stood them in good stead when it came to publicising the new party, and a former colleague on the New Zealand Herald, Alison Webber founded the Auckland branch."

Values Party contestation of elections
The Values Party contested six general elections in 1972, 1975, 1978, 1981, 1984 and 1987. Despite strong showings in 1975 and 1978 it did not gain seats under the first-past-the-post electoral system in use at that time. It did however manage to get some candidates elected to local government. The first, Helen Smith of Titahi Bay, joined the Porirua City Council in 1973. The following year party leader Tony Brunt was elected as a Wellington City Councillor and was re-elected in 1977. Mike Ward was a Nelson City Councillor from 1983 to 1989 under a Values banner. Jon Mayson, a party co-leader in the 1980s, was elected a member of the Bay of Plenty Harbour Board on a Values Party ticket.

Under the leadership of polytechnic economics lecturer Tony Kunowski and deputy leader Margaret Crozier, the Values Party contested the 1978 general election with a considerable following, but again failed to win seats in parliament. Most probably this was mainly because voters at that time were more concerned about rapidly rising unemployment than anything else. The idea of an ecological "zero growth" society envisaged by Values Party members had met with the economic reality of near-zero GDP growth, high price-inflation, and an investment strike by business. Although gaining fewer votes than the New Zealand Labour Party, Robert Muldoon's National Party, which promised to create many more jobs by borrowing foreign funds to build large infrastructural projects (the so-called "Think Big" strategy, developing oil, gas, coal and electricity resources), was returned to government at the 1978 election.

Electoral results

Decline of the party
After the demoralising election result, the Values Party faced internal conflict between the "red" greens and the "fundamentalist" greens, and it fragmented amidst quarrels about organisational principles. Kunowski was ousted as party leader following the 1978 election leading him to pursue a career as a banker. He later joined the Labour Party and was elected to the Canterbury Regional Council on the Labour ticket. In 1979 Margaret Crozier became the leader with Cathy Wilson as deputy leader; it was the first time women had led a political party in New Zealand. "In the late seventies the German Greens wrote to us [they] said 'we like your manifesto, can we use your policy?' " Jeanette Fitzsimons

In July 1989 the ruling council of the party agreed in principle to wind up the party and balloted its 200 remaining members for approval. However in May 1990, remnants of the Values Party merged with several other environmentalist organisations to form the Green Party of Aotearoa New Zealand, which entered parliament in 1996 and formed part of the Government in 2017. Many former members of the Values Party became active in the Green Party – notably Jeanette Fitzsimons, Rod Donald and Mike Ward.

References

Further reading 
 Browning, Clare. (2012). Beyond today : a Values story. Wellington: C. Browning.  OCLC

External links

The development of the first two Green parties in New Zealand and Tasmania. 
The history of the NZ greens beginning with the Values Party
1975 Values Party manifesto 
 Tony Kunowski, Margaret Crozier and Terry McDavitt at the 1978 Values Party conference
 Tony Brunt: 50 years since founding the Values Party. Interview on RNZ, 11 June 2022

Political parties established in 1972
Political parties disestablished in 1990
Defunct political parties in New Zealand
Green political parties in New Zealand
1972 in the environment
1972 establishments in New Zealand
1990 disestablishments in New Zealand
Defunct green political parties